Pia Reyes is a Filipino American model and actress. She was the November 1988 Playboy Playmate of the Month, and appeared in the 1993 cult horror film Return of the Living Dead 3 and Steven Seagal's On Deadly Ground (1994), among other projects.

Reyes was once married to convicted French con artist, Christophe Rocancourt, with whom she has a son, Zeus.  On April 27, 2001 she and Rocancourt were arrested in Oak Bay, British Columbia, Canada. Rocancourt was charged with fraud, but Reyes was immediately released after authorities determined that she had no involvement in her husband's fraudulent activities.

She later relocated to New York and enrolled in 2009 at the NYU School of Professional and Continuing Studies Portfolio Management Advanced Certificate Program. She finished with the Advanced Certificate in Portfolio Management.

See also
 List of people in Playboy 1980–89

References

External links

1964 births
Actresses from Pennsylvania
American Playboy Playmates of Asian descent
Filipino emigrants to the United States
Living people
New York University alumni
People from Delaware County, Pennsylvania
People from Manila
1980s Playboy Playmates
21st-century American women